Robert 'Robbie' Boyle is a former Gaelic footballer. He played for the Erins Isle club and for the Dublin county team.

Football career
He won an all-Ireland medal with Dublin in 1995, with an appearance as a substitute.

References

Year of birth missing (living people)
Living people
Dublin inter-county Gaelic footballers
Erins Isle Gaelic footballers
Winners of one All-Ireland medal (Gaelic football)